The Suez Canal Authority Stadium is located in Ismailia, Egypt. It is used by Olympic El Qanah. The stadium was demolished and was completely reconstructed between 2019 and 2022. Before the reconstruction, it had a capacity of 10,000. The stadium currently has a capacity of 22,000. It is an all-seater.

References

Football venues in Egypt